Henry Müller (12 August 1896 – 8 September 1982) was a German international footballer who played for Victoria Hamburg.

References

External links
 

1896 births
1982 deaths
German footballers
Footballers from Hamburg
Association football defenders
Germany international footballers
SC Victoria Hamburg players